Tŷ Mawr (sometimes Ty Mawr) means "big house" in Welsh and may refer to the following historical houses or areas in Wales:
Tŷ Mawr, Castle Caereinion in Powys
Tŷ Mawr, Dingestow in Monmouthshire
Tŷ Mawr Wybrnant in Conwy County Borough
Caeau Ty-mawr, a Site of Special Scientific Interest in Brecknock, Powys
Holyhead Mountain Hut Circles, a group of prehistoric dwellings on Holy Island, Anglesey
Tŷ Mawr, Wrexham, country park in Wrexham County Borough
Ty Mawr Reservoir, reservoir in Wrexham County Borough